Vânia Sofia Olim Marote de Ribeiro Fernandes (born 25 September 1985) is a Portuguese singer from Funchal, Madeira (Portugal).

Known for her powerful stage presence, as well as her prominent and versatile voice, Fernandes has participated in several singing contests and performed in public in both her home island of Madeira and on the mainland of Portugal since 1997.

In 2007, Vânia won Portuguese public television's talent contest, Operação Triunfo (a kind of Star Academy).  That same year, she completed her professional music studies and training in singing, including jazz, at Madeira's Conservatory.

On 22 May 2008 Fernandes sung "Senhora do mar" (Lady of the Sea) during the second semi-final of the Eurovision Song Contest 2008 in Belgrade, Serbia.  The song was the winner of the 2008 edition of Portugal's national selection final for Eurovision, the Festival da Canção.  She represented Portugal in the Eurovision final on 24 May 2008 and gained 13th place (out of 25) with 69 points. In the semi-final, she was 2nd, with 120 points.

External links

Vânia Fernandes' web site (in English and Portuguese)
Vânia singing "Senhora do Mar" at ESC 2008 Final
Vânia Fernandes' biography on the official Eurovision Song Contest - Belgrade 2008 web site
Vânia Fernandes' page on Facebook
 

1985 births
Living people
People from Funchal
Eurovision Song Contest entrants of 2008
Eurovision Song Contest entrants for Portugal
21st-century Portuguese women singers
Star Academy winners
Operación Triunfo contestants